Henderson Group plc was a global investment management company with its principal place of business in the City of London. It merged with Janus Capital Group in May 2017 to create Janus Henderson.

History
The Company was established in 1934 to administer the estates of Alexander Henderson, 1st Baron Faringdon. In 1975, it started managing pension funds. It was first listed on the London Stock Exchange in 1983. On re-listing as HHG Group in 2003, the group comprised Henderson Global Investors (a UK-based investment manager), Life Services (comprising the life and pension books of Pearl Assurance, NPI, National Provident Life, London Life, and HHG Services) and the financial advisory firm, Towry Law.

Between 2008 and 2012, the Group was tax-resident in the Republic of Ireland. With effect from 12 December 2012, the Group changed its tax residency from the Republic of Ireland to the UK by means of a corporate restructuring. In 2010, the company phased out the New Star name, and in 2014, the company rolled out a new brand identity.

In May 2017, the company completed a merger with Janus Capital Group to form Janus Henderson.
 

Acquisitions and sales

Operations
The company invests in four primary asset classes: equities, fixed income, property and private equity. Its institutional product range also includes several hedge funds (under the Alphagen name).

References

External links
Official site
Google Finance profile
Simon Ward Blog

Investment management companies of the United Kingdom
Defunct companies based in London
Companies listed on the London Stock Exchange
Financial services companies established in 1934
1934 establishments in England
Financial services companies disestablished in 2017
2017 disestablishments in England
2017 mergers and acquisitions
Tax inversions
British companies disestablished in 2017
British companies established in 1934